Dursun Aydın Özbek (born 25 March 1949) is a Turkish businessman and 36th and 39th club president of Turkish multi-disciplined sports club Galatasaray S.K.

Career
Özbek was a member of board of directors and vice-president during previous president Duygun Yarsuvat until 2014. Collecting the majority of voting cast with 2,800 votes, Dursun Özbek was elected as the 36th president of Galatasaray S.K. following the ordinary general assembly taking place on 23 May 2015. He was defeated by challenger Mustafa Cengiz in the election held on 20 January 2018.

On 12 June 2022, Özbek was re-elected as the 39th President of the club, after a tight contention against the other candidate Eşref Hamamcıoğlu, prevailing with a narrow difference of 156 votes in total of 4,459 given.

Personal life
Dursun Özbek is married to Mesude Özbek with two children.

Trophies won by club during presidency
Source:

Football
 Süper Lig: 2014–15
 Turkish Cup: 2014–15
 Turkish Super Cup: 2015, 2016

Basketball
 EuroCup: 2015–16

References

Living people
People from Giresun
Istanbul Technical University alumni
Turkish businesspeople
Galatasaray S.K. presidents
1949 births